Hans Magnus Zetterström (born 9 December 1971 in Eskilstuna, Sweden) is an international motorcycle speedway rider.

Career
Zetterström became European Champion in 2002 and won the Premier League Riders Championship in 2006. In 2008 he became the Swedish Champion.

In September 2009, during the Speedway Grand Prix Qualification he won the GP Challenge, which ensured that he claimed a permanent slot for the 2010 Grand Prix.

Individual European Championship appearances
 2002 - European Champion (12 points +3)
 2003 - 3rd place (11 points)

References

1971 births
Living people
Swedish speedway riders
Individual Speedway European Champions
Poole Pirates riders
Peterborough Panthers riders
Somerset Rebels riders
Belle Vue Aces riders
People from Eskilstuna
Sportspeople from Södermanland County